Rozhdestvensky (masculine), Rozhdestvenskaya (feminine), or Rozhdestvenskoye (neuter) is the name of several rural localities in Russia.

Modern localities
Rozhdestvensky, Republic of Bashkortostan, a village in Kirillovsky Selsoviet of Ufimsky District in the Republic of Bashkortostan
Rozhdestvensky, Karasuksky District, Novosibirsk Oblast, a settlement in Karasuksky District of Novosibirsk Oblast; 
Rozhdestvensky, Kochkovsky District, Novosibirsk Oblast, a settlement in Kochkovsky District of Novosibirsk Oblast; 
Rozhdestvensky, Oryol Oblast, a settlement in Pennovsky Selsoviet of Trosnyansky District in Oryol Oblast; 
Rozhdestvensky, Rostov Oblast, a khutor in Anastasiyevskoye Rural Settlement of Matveyevo-Kurgansky District in Rostov Oblast; 
Rozhdestvensky, Saratov Oblast, a settlement in Yekaterinovsky District of Saratov Oblast
Rozhdestvensky, Republic of Tatarstan, a settlement in Nurlatsky District of the Republic of Tatarstan
Rozhdestvensky, Tula Oblast, a settlement in Rozhdestvensky Rural Okrug of Leninsky District in Tula Oblast
Rozhdestvensky, Voronezh Oblast, a khutor in Markovskoye Rural Settlement of Kamensky District in Voronezh Oblast
Rozhdestvenskoye, Republic of Bashkortostan (or Rozhdestvensky), a village in Ilyino-Polyansky Selsoviet of Blagoveshchensky District in the Republic of Bashkortostan; 
Rozhdestvenskoye, Bogorodsky District, Kirov Oblast, a selo in Oshlansky Rural Okrug of Bogorodsky District in Kirov Oblast; 
Rozhdestvenskoye, Urzhumsky District, Kirov Oblast, a selo in Bogdanovsky Rural Okrug of Urzhumsky District in Kirov Oblast; 
Rozhdestvenskoye, Yaransky District, Kirov Oblast, a selo in Opytnopolsky Rural Okrug of Yaransky District in Kirov Oblast; 
Rozhdestvenskoye, Kostroma Oblast, a selo in Ivanovskoye Settlement of Sharyinsky District in Kostroma Oblast; 
Rozhdestvenskoye, Krasnoyarsk Krai, a selo in Rozhdestvensky Selsoviet of Kazachinsky District in Krasnoyarsk Krai
Rozhdestvenskoye, Medvensky District, Kursk Oblast, a selo in Chermoshnyansky Selsoviet of Medvensky District in Kursk Oblast
Rozhdestvenskoye, Shchigrovsky District, Kursk Oblast, a selo in Nikolsky Selsoviet of Shchigrovsky District in Kursk Oblast
Rozhdestvenskoye, Nizhny Novgorod Oblast, a village in Malozinovyevsky Selsoviet under the administrative jurisdiction of the city of oblast significance of Semyonov in Nizhny Novgorod Oblast; 
Rozhdestvenskoye, Dolzhansky District, Oryol Oblast, a selo in Dubrovsky Selsoviet of Dolzhansky District in Oryol Oblast; 
Rozhdestvenskoye, Kolpnyansky District, Oryol Oblast, a selo in Ushakovsky Selsoviet of Kolpnyansky District in Oryol Oblast; 
Rozhdestvenskoye, Trosnyansky District, Oryol Oblast, a selo in Pennovsky Selsoviet of Trosnyansky District in Oryol Oblast; 
Rozhdestvenskoye, Perm Krai, a selo in Permsky District of Perm Krai
Rozhdestvenskoye, Ryazan Oblast, a selo in Borovkovsky Rural Okrug of Alexandro-Nevsky District in Ryazan Oblast
Rozhdestvenskoye, Tambov Oblast, a selo in Rozhdestvensky Selsoviet of Rasskazovsky District in Tambov Oblast
Rozhdestvenskoye, Voronezh Oblast, a selo in Rozhdestvenskoye Rural Settlement of Povorinsky District in Voronezh Oblast
Rozhdestvenskaya, Stavropol Krai, a stanitsa in Rozhdestvensky Selsoviet of Izobilnensky District in Stavropol Krai

Alternative names
Rozhdestvensky, alternative name of Novaya Ulitsa, a settlement in Novoyamsky Rural Administrative Okrug of Sevsky District in Bryansk Oblast; 
Rozhdestvenskoye, alternative name of Krasnoye, a selo in Mikheyevsky Rural Okrug of Lebyazhsky District in Kirov Oblast; 
Rozhdestvenskoye, alternative name of Rozhdestveno, a village in Gabovskoye Rural Settlement of Dmitrovsky District in Moscow Oblast; 
Rozhdestvenskaya, alternative name of Rozhdestveno, a village under the administrative jurisdiction of the Town of Vereya in Naro-Fominsky District of Moscow Oblast; 
Rozhdestvenskoye, alternative name of Rozhdestvo, a village in Ateptsevskoye Rural Settlement of Naro-Fominsky District in Moscow Oblast; 
Rozhdestvensky, alternative name of Rozhdestvenka, a settlement in Chanovsky District of Novosibirsk Oblast; 
Rozhdestvensky, alternative name of Rozhdestvenka, a selo in Kupinsky District of Novosibirsk Oblast; 
Rozhdestvenskoye, alternative name of Rozhdestvenka, a selo in Suzunsky District of Novosibirsk Oblast; 
Rozhdestvensky, alternative name of Rozhdestvenka, a village in Tatarsky District of Novosibirsk Oblast; municipally, a part of Uvalsky Rural Settlement of that district; 
Rozhdestvensky, alternative name of Rozhdestvenka, a village in Lyubimovsky Rural Okrug of Okoneshnikovsky District in Omsk Oblast;